Rafael Nadal defeated the defending champion Alexander Zverev in the final, 6–1, 1–6, 6–3 to win the men's singles tennis title at the 2018 Italian Open. It was his record-extending eighth Italian Open title and his record-extending 32nd Masters title overall. With the win, Nadal also regained the ATP No. 1 singles ranking.

After failing to defend his runner-up points from the previous year, Novak Djokovic fell outside the Top 20 in rankings for the first time since October 2, 2006.

This was the last professional tournament for former world No. 13 Alexandr Dolgopolov. He lost in the first round to Djokovic.

Seeds
The top eight seeds receive a bye into the second round.

Draw

Finals

Top half

Section 1

Section 2

Bottom half

Section 3

Section 4

Qualifying

Seeds

Qualifiers

Qualifying draw

First qualifier

Second qualifier

Third qualifier

Fourth qualifier

Fifth qualifier

Sixth qualifier

Seventh qualifier

References

External links
Main Draw
Qualifying Draw

Men's Singles